Kasie DC was a Sunday night news and politics television program that aired on MSNBC, hosted by Kasie Hunt, who had been serving as NBC News' Capitol Hill correspondent, covering Congress across all NBC News and MSNBC platforms. The program premiered on October 15, 2017. Kasie DC aired Sundays from 7–9 p.m ET.

On September 10, 2020, it was announced Kasie DC would be canceled on September 13 as Hunt moved to host Way Too Early on early weekday mornings.

References

External links
 on MSNBC

2010s American television news shows
2010s American television talk shows
2020s American television news shows
2020s American television talk shows
2017 American television series debuts
2020 American television series endings
English-language television shows
MSNBC original programming